The  Second Conrad Sangma ministry is formed after the swearing-in ceremony held on 7 March 2023. Governor Phagu Chauhan took oath of Chief Minister and 11 other ministers. Conrad Sangma took oath as Chief Minister for second consecutive term became first one to do so in electoral history of Meghalaya.

Background 
After the results declared of 2023 Meghalaya Legislative Assembly election, no party got majority in the house. Later BJP, HSPDP, PDF, UDP, and Independent MLAs supported NPP led Meghalaya Democratic Alliance. 

With 45 MLAs, the government was formed under  Conrad Sangma along with 11 ministers (7 NPP, 2 UDP, 1 each of BJP and HSPDP). Swearing ceremony was held on 7 March 2023. Prime Minister Narendra Modi, Union Home Minister Amit Shah along with Assam Chief Minister and NEDA convenor Himanta Biswa Sarma were also present in the ceremony.

Council of Ministers

Sources

Cabinet Spokesperson

Demographics of Council of Ministers

References

Lists of current Indian state and territorial ministries
Bharatiya Janata Party
National People's Party (India)
2018 in Indian politics
State cabinet ministers of Meghalaya
United Democratic Party (Meghalaya)
Meghalaya ministries
Hill State People's Democratic Party
Cabinets established in 2023